Daniel Pearl Magnet High School (DPMHS) is a magnet school within the Los Angeles Unified School District in Lake Balboa, Los Angeles, near Van Nuys, in the San Fernando Valley.

It is the smallest comprehensive high school in LAUSD. The high school offers a complete academic program with an emphasis on journalism and communications.

History 

The school started as a part of Birmingham High School in 1995. In May 2007, the Magnet was renamed. Its current name honors Daniel Pearl, a Wall Street Journal reporter killed by terrorists who was an alumnus of Birmingham High School.

Prior to Pearl Magnet's separation from Birmingham, Birmingham became an independent charter school within LAUSD. About 66% of the faculty members of the school supported it. Because of the divisions within teachers and other staff members, the faculty and staff of the magnet program received permission from LAUSD to split from Birmingham.
In 2009, DPMHS was formed as an independent high school on the Birmingham campus. Connie Llanos of the Los Angeles Daily News said that Pearl "got off to a rocky start." During the first year as a standalone school, one third of the students left. Some left due to conflicts with Birmingham staff and students; some Birmingham students and staff members tormented Pearl students. Some left because Pearl was so small; they wanted a more comprehensive high school experience.

DPMHS showed academic prowess as a standalone school. In the Spring 2011 semester, 94% of the tenth grade students passed the California High School Exit Exam (CAHSEE) on the first attempt. It is one of the highest passing rates of the rates of the high schools within the district. As of 2011 the school has an 80% graduation rate, while the average LAUSD graduation rate is 56%. In addition, 72% of the Pearl classes meet university entrance requirements.

In 2010 Pearl moved into a former special education center adjacent to Birmingham. Its current location is made up of the last buildings remaining from Birmingham General Hospital. The site had previously been occupied by West Valley School since 1970. During that year the school had 313 students, while it had a capacity of 500. Pearl is among the smallest high schools in the LAUSD. Most classes had 30 or less students, and some classes had 12 students each. Many LAUSD high schools have classes of 40 students.

Academics 

DPMHS offers a complete college preparation program, with 72% of the courses offered meeting entrance requirements of the University of California.

The school had a 94% pass rate for the 2011 CAHSEE, the third highest in LAUSD. In addition, it had an API Score of 823 for the 2011–2012 academic year.

At the June, 2010 graduation, 65 of 68 seniors graduated, which gave the school a 95.5% pass rate, compared to 53% for LAUSD. For the June, 2016 graduation, 93 of 94 seniors graduated, which is a 98.9% pass rate.

In May, 2016, U.S. News & World Report ranked DPMHS in the top 4.3% (845 out of 19,908) of public high schools in the United States, and awarded the school a Silver Medal ranking.  The School was also ranked in the same study as #120 in the nationwide ranking of Magnet Schools.  These scores indicate that DPMHS is considered to be the top performing public non-charter High School in the San Fernando Valley.

All areas of academic classes are offered at DPMHS:

Mathematics
Algebra I
Geometry
Algebra II
Trigonometry
AP Calculus
English
Composition
American Literature
World Literature
AP English Literature
AP English Language
Social Sciences
World History
Geography
US History
Government
Economics
Modern Languages
Spanish
Spanish for Spanish Speakers
Science
Biology
Chemistry
Physics
Journalism
Journalism
Newspaper
Yearbook
Media
Video Production
Film Making
Music
Athletics
Physical Education
Sports (at Birmingham High School)

Publications 

The Pearl Post is the student newspaper published at DPMHS.

On June 26, 2016, the Los Angeles Press Club recognized The Pearl Post as High School Newspaper of the Year, stating that  "The Pearl Post combines an exciting range of articles, photos, and opinion pieces in a well-organized layout, making it easier and quicker to find sections of interest and, thus, keeping its readers coming back for more."

Censorship 

In November 2021, students wrote an article about the district's COVID protocols, and named a librarian who refused to comply with the district's vaccine mandate, resulting in the closure of the school's library. The librarian complained to the principal, alleging that the story violated HIPAA. The principal ordered Adriana Chavira, student newspaper advisor, to censor the student paper by removing the librarian's name. She refused, with the support of the Student Press Law Center and the family of Daniel Pearl. In September of 2022, the principal suspended the teacher without pay, but in an appeal hearing on September 16, the district rescinded the suspension.

Houses 

In the Spring 2011 semester, Houses were introduced as a part of the school culture. The houses are named after famous journalists. Members of the Houses are awarded House Points for academic, athletic, or service achievements; points are deducted for infractions such as tardiness, missing homework, or violation of class or school rules. All of the Houses compete for the House Cup, which is awarded at an annual Banquet at the end of the school year. As of August 2019, the system of Houses has been abolished, as its overseer and founder has retired from teaching.

House of the Year

See also

 High Tech Los Angeles
 Birmingham High School

References

External links
 Daniel Pearl Magnet High School

High schools in the San Fernando Valley
High schools in Los Angeles
Lake Balboa, Los Angeles
Los Angeles Unified School District schools
Magnet schools in California
Van Nuys, Los Angeles
Educational institutions established in 2009
2009 establishments in California